Vanity sizing, or size inflation, is the phenomenon of ready-to-wear clothing of the same nominal size becoming bigger in physical size over time. This has been documented primarily in the United States and the United Kingdom. The use of US standard clothing sizes by manufacturers as the official guidelines for clothing sizes was abandoned in 1983. In the United States, although clothing size standards exist (i.e., ASTM), most companies do not use them any longer.

Size inconsistency has existed since at least 1937. In 1967, the same bust size was a size 8. In 2011, it was a size 0. Some argue that vanity sizing is designed to satisfy wearers' wishes to appear thin and feel better about themselves. This works by adhering to the theory of compensatory self-enhancement, as vanity sizing promotes a more positive self-image of one upon seeing a smaller label. Designer Nicole Miller introduced size 0 because of its strong California presence and to satisfy the request of many Asian customers. It introduced subzero sizes for naturally petite women. However, the increasing size of clothing with the same nominal size caused Nicole Miller to introduce size 0, 00, or subzero sizes. The UK's Chief Medical Officer has suggested that vanity sizing has contributed to the normalisation of obesity in society. 

In 2003, a study that measured over 1,000 pairs of women's pants found that pants from more expensive brands tended to be smaller than those from cheaper brands with the same nominal size.

US pattern sizing measurements: 1931–2015

US misses standard sizing measurements: 1958–2011

Men's clothing
Although more common in women's apparel, vanity sizing occurs in men's clothing as well. For example, men's pants are traditionally marked with two numbers, "waist" (waist circumference) and "inseam" (distance from the crotch to the hem of the pant). While the nominal inseam is fairly accurate, the nominal waist may be quite a bit smaller than the actual waist, in US sizes. In 2010, Abram Sauer of Esquire measured several pairs of dress pants with a nominal waist size of 36 at different US retailers and found that actual measurements ranged from 37 to 41 inches. The phenomenon has also been noticed in the United Kingdom, where a 2011 study found misleading labels on more than half of checked items of clothing. In that study, the worst offenders understated waist circumferences by 1.5 to 2 inches. London-based market analyst Mintel say that the number of men reporting varying waistlines from store to store doubled between 2005 and 2011.

See also
 Body image
 EN 13402, emerging European and international clothing standard from 2007, based on body measurements in centimeters
 US standard clothing size, an inch based standard based on body measurements, gained little traction and was replaced by vanity sizing from the 1980s

References

External links

 Press release.
Rickey, M (2007-09-22). "Vanity sizing". The Times (London).

Clothing controversies
Fashion design
Sizes in clothing
Advertising techniques